Keraladithyapuram is a small village situated in the suburbs of Thiruvananthapuram.It is 1 km away from Mannathala and situated on Mannanthala-Powdikonam-Sreekariyam route.
It is located at.

Location
Keraladithyapuram is located at. It is 1 km away from Main Central Road and 11 km away from the city East Fort.The nearest airport is Thiruvananthapuram International Airport which is 13 km away and the nearest railway station Thiruvananthapuram Central is 10 km away. Regular bus service is provided by Kerala State Road Transport Corporation.

Culture
Majority of the population are Hindu's.Hindu's, Muslim's and Christian's coexist peacefully in this lush greeny village. The area is surrounded by a number of Hindu Temple's and other religious centers. Kelamangalam Sree Mahavishnu Temple one of the ancient temple in Kerala which is renovated by His Highness Sree Chithra Thirunal. The main deity is Mahavishnu. The idol is faced to the west. Mailappaly Devi Temple is also one of the prominent temple in the area. Christian religious institutions like Mar Thoma Bishop's House and Trivandrum Bible College are also situated in the area.

Places of interest
 Kelamangalam Sree Mahavishnu Temple
 Sree Mailappally Devi Temple
 Mar Thoma Bishop's House

References

Villages in Thiruvananthapuram district